Aliaksandr Bury and Denis Istomin were the defending champions, but Bury chose to compete in Kitzbühel instead. Istomin played alongside Dominic Inglot, but lost in the quarterfinals to Purav Raja and Divij Sharan.

Julio Peralta and Horacio Zeballos won the title, defeating Mate Pavić and Michael Venus in the final, 7–6(7–2), 6–2.

Seeds

Draw

Draw

References
 Main Draw

Swiss Open Gstaad - Doubles
2016 Doubles